Ologamasidae is a family of mites in the order Mesostigmata. There are more than 40 genera and 470 described species in Ologamasidae.

Genera
These 44 genera belong to the family Ologamasidae:

 Acugamasus Lee, 1970
 Acuphis Karg, 1998
 Allogamasellus Athias-Henriot, 1961
 Antennolaelaps Womersley, 1956
 Athiasella Lee, 1973
 Caliphis Lee, 1970
 Cymiphis Lee, 1970
 Desectophis Karg, 2003
 Euepicrius Womersley, 1942
 Euryparasitus Oudemans, 1902
 Evanssellus Ryke, 1961
 Gamasellevans Loots & Ryke, 1967
 Gamaselliphis Ryke, 1961
 Gamasellopsis Loots & Ryke, 1966
 Gamasellus Berlese, 1892
 Gamasiphis Berlese, 1904
 Gamasiphoides Womersley, 1956
 Gamasitus Womersley, 1956
 Geogamasus Lee, 1970
 Heterogamasus Trägårdh, 1907
 Heydeniella Richters, 1907
 Hiniphis Lee, 1970
 Hydrogamasellus Hirschmann, 1966
 Hydrogamasus Berlese, 1892
 Laelaptiella Womersley, 1956
 Laelogamasus Berlese, 1905
 Litogamasus Lee, 1970
 Neogamasellevans Loots & Ryke, 1967
 Notogamasellus Loots & Ryke, 1965
 Ologamasus Berlese, 1888
 Onchogamasus Womersley, 1956
 Oriflammella Halliday, 2008
 Pachymasiphis Karg, 1996
 Parasitiphis Womersley, 1956
 Periseius Womersley, 1961
 Pilellus Lee, 1970
 Podonotogamasellus Loots & Ryke, 1965
 Pyriphis Lee, 1970
 Queenslandolaelaps Womersley, 1956
 Rhodacaroides Willmann
 Rykellus Lee, 1970
 Sessiluncus Canestrini, 1898
 Solugamasus Lee, 1973
 Stylochirus Canestrini &  Canestrini, 1882

References

 
Acari families